Nyagan is a town in the northwest of Khanty–Mansi Autonomous Okrug, Russia, located near the Ob River and  northwest of Khanty-Mansiysk. It is named after the Nyagan-Yugan River, a tributary of the Ob River. Population:

Economy and history
Nyagan is one of the youngest towns in Western Siberia. It was established in 1965 as a forestry center; it is now principally a center of the petroleum and natural gas industries, and was originally named Nyakh. This toponym appeared on maps in the same year, but the town was renamed on August 15, 1985. The town territory is a waterlogged area, and the region is notable for sudden temperature drops. The railway from Yekaterinburg to the Ob region has passed through Nyagan since April 2, 1967. Nyagan Airport, which opened in 1993, handles the Russian Antonov An-24, Yakovlev Yak-40, and Tupolev Tu-134 aircraft.

Climate
Classified by Köppen-Geiger system as continental sub-arctic climate (Dfc), with warm-to-mild summers and long very cold winters. Precipitation is distributed over the course of the year, but is somewhat more in summer.

Administrative and municipal status
Within the framework of administrative divisions, it is incorporated as the town of okrug significance of Nyagan—an administrative unit with the status equal to that of the districts. As a municipal division, the town of okrug significance of Nyagan is incorporated as Nyagan Urban Okrug.

Culture
On September 1, 2000 a regional museum opened in Nyagan.

Notable people
Maria Sharapova, tennis player born in Nyagan.
Darya Domracheva, biathlete who grew up in Nyagan.

References

Notes

Sources

Cities and towns in Khanty-Mansi Autonomous Okrug
Cities and towns built in the Soviet Union
Populated places established in 1965
1965 establishments in the Soviet Union
Socialist planned cities